is a synchronized dance that originated in Japan. Unlike most club dancing and rave dancing, there are specific synchronized movements for each song much like line dancing. Para Para has existed since the early 1980s when European countries started selling Italo disco and Euro disco, and in the mid-to late 1970s, new wave and synthpop music in Japan. However, it did not achieve much popularity outside Japan until the late 1990s.

Para Para is strongly associated with Eurobeat. Dave Rodgers, a Eurobeat artist, has described Para Para as the only way to dance to Eurobeat, which is usually "so fast."

Description 
Para Para dancing consists of mostly upper body movements in synchronization with a four-on-the-floor rhythm. Dancing involves choreographed motions with the arms and hands while stepping to the right and left, similar to the movements of traditional festival dances such as Bon Odori and cheering squads called Ōendan. Para Para is generally danced to eurobeat and Eurodance music, with each track having its own dance routine. ParaPara involves very little lower body movement, with the exception of moving one's hips, stepping in place, and jumping or hopping. Some routines feature more complex leg movements. Routines are generally choreographed by groups affiliated with popular clubs in Japan (see below).

Fans of Para Para often refer to themselves as "Paralists" and include official and unofficial teams of dancers in Japan, Chile, Brazil, Spain, The United States, Canada, Taiwan, Hong Kong, Finland, and several other countries. Some teams are recognized by major Japanese music labels such as Avex and have been featured in Japanese media such as the magazine Egg. Para Para dancing's history is largely described by the community and historians in terms of "booms", during which Para Para's popularity was increased. Times of decreased popularity are referred to as "glacial" periods. To date, there have been four distinct "booms", each with a distinct cultural and historical context.

Origin
There are several theories about the origin of ParaPara dancing. One view is that it started in the early 1980s when men working in the VIP room in clubs would choreograph dances to impress women clientele. Another view is that it developed from the Takenoko-zoku subculture that would gather in the pedestrian plaza of Yoyogi Park in Harajuku to dance choreographed routines to popular music and disco.

Etymology
It is thought that the term "ParaPara" is derived from the onomatopoeic expression of one's hand movements along with the music, where the beat of the music was described similarly to "Pa-pa pa-pa-ra ra-ra", similar to "boop-boop-bee-doop" in English.

History

1st Boom (1987–1992) 
ParaPara is thought to have started in the late 1980s at high-class discos during Japan's bubble era. Men dressed in black suits would teach routines at clubs such as Aoyama King & Queen and Maharaja Azabu-jūban. It is difficult to learn some of the dances due to the fact that no recordings exist of the routines. It is also largely unknown which clubs made specific routines during this era because of this.

Wangan 
The term  mainly describes the choreography that came from the clubs around Tokyo Bay around 1993. Some of these clubs include Eden Roc and Maharaja Azabu-jūban. The choreography is very hard to find, like 1st Boom videos, but it is slightly easier due to the availability of recording devices at the time. Routines of songs from the latter half of the Eurobeat Fantasy, That's Eurobeat, Super Eurobeat volumes 1 through 49, and Maharaja Night Hi-NRG Revolution volumes 1 through 9 music series are usually categorized as wangan. Some wangan ParaPara videos include Venus Cafe  Special and Kyoto Gingerman One Gun. Unfortunately, many of the wangan dancers have retired from dancing ParaPara. There are currently very few club events in Japan that play wangan songs.

2nd Boom (1993–1995) 
Many ParaPara routines originate from this era. Clubs like Xenon, Twinstar, King & Queen, and Maharaja were very popular during this period. It was also during this period when Avex Trax, an independent music label in Japan that produces Super Eurobeat, released one of the first officially licensed ParaPara videos to clubs on March 21, 1994, entitled "ParaPara Kyouten 0" (パラパラ教典 0). The video features 40 songs from the 2nd boom era and most of the featured routines are still danced today. The beginning of this boom can be marked by the release of Super Eurobeat volume 40 and lasted until as late as Super Eurobeat volume 80. During the latter half of this boom, some clubs created "unofficial" routines, referred to as "maniac", which were featured in Hibiya Radio City, Yokohama Maharaja, and Tottori Eleven.

3rd Boom (1999–2001) 
The cause of this boom has largely been credited to the appearance of Takuya Kimura on SMAPxSMAP, a television program, dancing to "Night of Fire" / Niko and "Mickey Mouse March" (Eurobeat Version) / Domino. During this period, with Xenon closed, Twinstar continued to make routines. 9LoveJ and Velfarre started making their own routines. The popularity of this period early on was amplified by gal-culture as well. In commercial videos, Avex and other competitors like Victor and Digibeat began releasing regular commercial parapara videos that featured routines for songs from their respective Eurobeat CDs. Some of these series include ParaPara Paradise, ParaPara Panic!, and Euroパラパラ How. ParaPara Paradise was the most popular series in sales and featured an idol group called ParaPara Allstars (PPA). The group originally consisted of Richie, Maki, Miho, Satoko, Tomomi, and Ryoko. At the time, Richie had been in many Twinstar videos and Satoko was featured in many 9LoveJ videos. Some people regard them as idols today. During this period, maniac dances also were choreographed. Some of the more popular club events were Medusa and Joy.

4th Boom (2005–2010) 
Although it is widely disputed that there was a 4th boom, even among Japanese historians, there was a noticeable change in the parapara scene in 2005. Avex became aggressive in selling parapara DVDs like the Gazen ParaPara!! series and We Love TechPara series in 2005, which began in this boom. Its height could be considered to be 2007 when Farm Records was releasing ParaPara DVDs or circa 2009 when the ani-para boom reached its height. Circa 2008, many ParaPara routines were being choreographed to eurobeat remixes of anime songs. The dances were mainly choreographed by 9LoveJ.

When the ani-para boom ended in 2010, Avex stopped releasing videos and 9LoveJ removed ParaPara from their event altogether. At the time of writing, there have been no major commercially released ParaPara videos since then. As for maniac events, Joy and TMD choreographed until around 2008, when they stopped altogether.

4th Boom Glacial Period (2010–) 
With Avex Trax halting all commercial ParaPara videos, the marketing that was associated with it dwindled as well. As a result, there has been a noticeable decline in newer paralists. This decline has deeply affected the ParaPara scene and has resulted in a decline of club event attendance. As a response to the attendance decline, many events such as StarFire, Ravenous, and others have moved to smaller venues to save costs rather than stopping.

The Internet has changed the ParaPara scene, even in Japan as well. Currently, the community learns routines from people who film the choreographers teaching the dances at club events. However, many of the lessons can now be found on YouTube, with even some events posting their own lessons as opposed to third parties. In addition, the only official club events that are active are SEF and Starfire. 9LoveJ stopped playing eurobeat and hyper techno around the end of 2010.

Variants 
Some variants of Para Para dancing are TechPara (danced to hyper techno) and TraPara (danced to trance).

There are people who make their own parapara routines to their favorite Eurobeat songs. These Parapara routines are called Oripara. Oripara is typically a reserved word for routines that are not made by famous parapara choreographers or taught at parapara club events.

Official vs. maniac 
The term "official" in the parapara world describes routines made by certain clubs/choreography groups in Japan. A non-exhaustive list of official club events are Starfire, SEF, 9LoveJ, and Twinstar. These routines are danced and learned by most people in the community. In a response to official routines, people have made their own in Japan called "maniac" routines. This movement started in the late 1990s with clubs like Hibiya Radio City and Tottori Eleven choreographing their own routines. In addition to the club events mentioned, other famous maniac club events that existed were Medusa, Area, Joy, AXOS, Bless, and TMD. , club events in Japan have not choreographed many maniac routines and this movement has basically stopped. However, some official club events like Starfire and SEF still go on today. Some paralists prefer maniac to official routines, though, and continue to have small events like Ravenous that play songs that have maniac dances to them.

Choreographer groups 
There are a few choreographer groups that have stood out in the history of ParaPara.

 is a long-running group of choreographers that has had many members. It is unclear when the group first began, but it is assumed to be in the early 1990s. The team had the most impact in Twinstar where they choreographed most of the ParaPara routines.
. Their real names in that order, with the exception of  because his real name is unknown, are Keita Fukaya, Takashi Arai, Taisuke Hotta, and Haruki Takahashi. All of these members listed appear in Twinstar club videos at least once. Their real names are Yoshihiro Yamada, Ryohei Yamaoka, and Katsuyoshi Inomata.

T-RREX is also a long-running official choreographer group. The initials stand for Twinstar, Rie, Richie, Xenon which refers to when T-RREX was started. They mainly choreograph for the club event StarFire these days because Twinstar closed in 2003. As of 2010,  has not been active in the ParaPara community and does not dance ParaPara much anymore. It is unclear if  is still in T-RREX.

Team SEF is another long-running official choreographer group. They strictly choreograph for the club event SEF. The name "Team SEF" wasn't popular until the SEF Gold club videos were first released around 2004. The members around that time were Ichi, Omami, Rena, Yano, Shingo, Kahori, and possibly Satoko. After Velfarre closed in 2006, almost all of the members were replaced when the SEF event changed names to SEF Deluxe. The members as of 2015 are Manami, Rumine, Kaihei, Kei, Mai, Shiori and Sakiko.

Typical ParaPara club event 
In any given week, there are multiple ParaPara events in Japan. A typical ParaPara club event begins the first 30 minutes by playing either Italo disco, dance, or other genres besides Eurobeat. Usually there are not many people during the first 30 minutes, so this is why it is done. After the first 20 or 30 minutes, depending on the number of people in the club, danceable music starts. Depending on the event, the first danceable songs played are different. For example, if one was at an event where the DJs played only Eurobeat songs from the 1990s, then the first songs would be from 1990-1991. If one were at a more official/modern event like SEF or StarFire, the songs would probably start around 1998-1999, when the 3rd ParaPara boom began. In most events, the songs have some sort of progression by year released, continuing until the end of the club event.

Some events play whatever they feel like and may start playing songs from 2006, for example. There are some events that play Techno as well as Eurobeat. In these events, there are rarely people who dance both ParaPara and TechPara. Most people sit out one or the other, depending on what routines they know. At most club events, there is a  where new ParaPara routines are taught. This is a very important part of a club event because, without club lessons, there might not be new ParaPara routines. A lesson is usually taught in 15 or 20 minutes. During a lesson, the new routine is danced first with music. After that, with the help of a commentator to give counts, the dancer slowly dances each part of the routine to help people learn it without music. After this is done, the routine is danced for a final time with music. After the lesson, there are two or three more sets of songs played until the event ends.

Club videos 
Club videos are an important part of ParaPara, but their importance has changed over the years. The first-known ParaPara club video to be released was released by Avex Trax as a promotional VHS on March 21, 1994 called . After that, many club videos were released as people were not able to film lessons in the 1990s. They became highly desirable commodities to some people because lessons were almost impossible to find before 2004-2005 and many dancers perform routines.

These videos are not sold commercially and are generally only distributed at only one event, which makes them extremely rare and impossible for foreigners to see. Because of these reasons, random people began to sell club videos, mainly DVD copies, online on auction websites like Yahoo! Auctions Japan and Mobaku.jp. A full series of SEF Gold for example would usually sell for about 5,000 yen while a much longer series like Xenon would sell for 9,000 yen or more. As of 2010, with the decline of ParaPara, this has basically stopped. However, a project that began on March 9, 2013 on YouTube called ParaPara Open Source Project has attempted to solve the problem of the rarity of club videos by uploading them to the public. Club videos released since 2009 have become less and less important as some people have begun to upload lessons mainly to video-sharing websites like YouTube. Because of this, club events like StarFire have at least one routine on a club video that has never been taught as a lesson. In the 2010s, club videos are not released as much anymore with new DVDs only being distributed by StarFire and SEF every 5–6 months. This is a sharp difference from 1994-1995 when there over 100 club videos released across Japan in only two years.

Refilms 
A refilm is a home-made, usually non-profit video in which dancers film themselves dancing parapara routines. The routines usually come from commercial or club videos, but some have been known to film their own routines, which is a phenomenon called "oripara." These videos have not played a big part in the Japanese parapara community, possibly for copyright reasons, but they are very big part of the international parapara community since there are no large parapara events outside Japan. The two general purposes of a refilm are to highlight a rare routine or to show the public ones' skills. With the advent of YouTube, refilms have become more visible internationally to even non-paralists.

List of notable clubs 
 Twin Star (1994-2003) Kagurazaka, Shinjuku
 Velfarre (1994-2006) Roppongi, Tokyo
 Maharaja Roppongi (2010–present) Roppongi, Tokyo
 Maharaja Azabujyuuban (Main Office) (1984-1997) Azabu-jyuuban, Tokyo
 Yokohama Maharaja (1986-1998) Yokohama
 Shinjuku Club Complex Code (???-2008?) Shinjuku, Tokyo

List of notable official club events 
 Hyper Star Energy (1993-2003) at Twin Star in Kagurazaka, Shinjuku, Tokyo
 Xenon (~1994-1997) at Xenon in Shinjuku, Tokyo
 Area (1995-1998) at Area in Roppongi, Tokyo
 9LoveJ (1998-2010?) mostly in Shibuya, but in Grace Bali in Shinjuku, Tokyo from 2007-2010~
 Super Euro Flash [SEF] (1998-2000) at Velfarre in Roppongi, Tokyo
 SEF Mach!! (2001-2004) at Velfarre
 SEF Gold (2004-2006) at Velfarre
 SEF DX (SEF Deluxe) (2007–present) at Xross in Tokyo and presently at Maharaja Roppongi
 Starfire (2004–present) at Area until 2005, 2009–2014 at club Pasela in Ginza, Tokyo, and 2014–?? at Grace Bali in Shinjuku, Tokyo, and back to club Pasela in 2016–present
 B-1 Dynamite!! (late 2005–present) presently at Shinjuku Gatsby House, hosted by Starfire

List of notable maniac club events 
 Medusa (2000-2002), which is considered to be the most official of maniac choreography groups.
 Joy (~1998-2008) in Ibaraki Prefecture
 TMD (2000-2008), which was an entertainment event that was marketed towards gays and featured drag queens as guests. TMD also has the largest volume of ParaPara videos ever released (over 60).

In popular culture 
 Para Para experienced a huge boom in Japan in 1998–1999 when pop idol Takuya Kimura of SMAP performed it on television. It had such a large impact that even Mickey Mouse danced it in Tokyo Disneyland. People in Mickey Mouse and other Tokyo Disneyland costumes appeared on television dancing it with Takuya Kimura.
 The Japanese video game company Konami has released a series of video games called ParaParaParadise as part of its Bemani series of music-based games. The games feature an octagonal platform with motion detecting sensors above it. Players must trigger the sensors by moving their arms (or other body parts) under the sensors when the corresponding arrow reaches the top of the screen placed at the front of the platform.
 Para Para Sakura, a film starring Aaron Kwok, features some Para Para dancing. The theme song for the film, "Para Para Sakura", is not related to any form of Para Para-based music.
 In one episode of the anime Dragon Ball GT, Goku, his granddaughter Pan, their friend Trunks, and even the robot Giru are put under a Para Para-type dance by the three Para Para Brothers.
 In the manga Gals!, Para Para dancing is a popular pastime for the main character Kotobuki Ran.
 In the video game Rumble Roses XX, one of the penalty games of Queen's Match is Para Para dancing. The girl who loses is forced to perform the dance and depending on the costume the player chose, the girl may have a positive, neutral, or negative reaction.
 Para Para dancing is featured heavily in the 2006 Japanese dorama Gal Circle. Many of the episodes revolve around it and nearly all of the major characters belong to a gal circle that is dedicated to it.
 K-pop girl group Kara created a rendition of the Para Para dance (also known as the "KARApara") for their fourth Japanese single "Go Go Summer!".
 The eighth opening to the anime Detective Conan, "Koi wa Thrill, Shock, Suspence" by Rina Aiuchi, features the main character, Edogawa Conan, performing a Para Para dance to the song.
 The song "Jimo-Ai Dash!" (from Japanese multimedia project Love Live! Sunshine!!) contains Para Para choreography, with the song itself being in a Eurobeat style.

Outside Japan 
The United Kingdom, United States, Canada, Finland, France, Taiwan, Spain, Chile, Scandinavia, Brazil, Argentina and other countries outside Japan have an active fanbase doing refilms on the Internet. These dancers have circles and groups that host panels at anime conventions where they teach parapara routines.

The only western parapara team ever to have been paid to perform ParaPara in Japan is American Dream which performed a special performance at Avex Rave 2005.

In the United States Geneon Entertainment released the Para Para MAX US Mix series of CDs, which contain remixes of anime theme music from Neon Genesis Evangelion, Pokémon, Magic Knight Rayearth, and many other anime productions. Volumes 1, 2, and 3 were released in 2005. Geneon held contests to promote the CD and its anime series. 2005's contest was held at Otakon on 20 August 2005. Geneon's efforts failed to expand the reach of Para Para in the United States. Regardless of this, Geneon released a Para Para instructional DVD called ParaPara MAX: The Moves 101, featuring several United States paralists. The DVD did not sell well due to an exclusive sales agreement with Media Play, Sam Goody and Suncoast Motion Picture Company, which soon went out of business. After the Anime Fusion Tour's conclusion in the summer of 2006, Yoko Ishida's management changed, which led to the end of Geneon's promotion of Para Para in the United States.

Between the years of 2006 and 2007 parapara briefly went mainstream in Germany and Austria due to the artist Shanadoo who danced parapara in some of their music video clips.

In the rest of Asia some editions of the ParaPara Paradise series were released in Hong Kong.

It is widely known and accepted among the members of the international parapara community that parapara's popularity outside Japan is very low.

See also 
 Eurobeat
 Italo disco
 Avex Trax
 Gazen ParaPara!!
 Para Para Paradise

References

External links 
 SUPER EUROBEAT@Web Official Super Eurobeat series website
 超然パラパラ！！ Official 超然パラパラ！！(Chouzen ParaPara!!) website
 Eurobeat Prime contains information about many eurobeat albums
 ParaParaMania A long-running CGI-based ParaPara video database section of a website, created by Yuuto Matsumoto
 ParaPara Lovers A ParaPara video database website created by John Bohne using LAMP (software bundle)
 PARAer An old, not updated HTML-based ParaPara video database possibly created by Mute (real name unknown).

Dances of Japan
Japanese subcultures
Musical subcultures
Novelty and fad dances
Eurobeat